The graph of desire is a conceptual tool in Lacanianism.

History
Lacan devised numerous quasi-mathematical diagrams to represent the structure of the unconscious and its points of contact with empirical and mental reality. He adapted figures from the field of topology in order to represent the Freudian view of the mind as embodying a "double inscription" (which could be defined as the ultimate inseparability of unconscious motivations from conscious ones).

Graph
The graph of desire was first proposed in a 1960 colloquium, and was later published in the Ecrits. It depends on ideas developed originally in Lacan's Schema R, a graph in which fundamental organising structures of the human mind are shown in a schematic relationship to the domains or "orders" which in turn structure human reality: the Imaginary, the Symbolic and the Real.

The graph of desire is a "flattened" representation of a signifying chain as it crosses a pathway Lacan called a vector of desire. It appears as two curved lines which cross one another at two separate points. Each line has a symbolic meaning.

Elements of the graph
The signifying chain begins in a linguistic sign (S) and progresses to a signification (S'), or a linguistic meaning. It can be expressed sententially and has a duration.

The vector of desire is a representation of the volition and will of the split or barred subject ($). Unlike the signifying chain, the vector of desire is expressed metaphorically, and has no duration.

It is necessary to bear in mind the special conception of the subject Lacan means by the $ symbol. The barred subject is the internally conflicted result of the processes of individuation that begin in infancy. In Lacan's account of individuation, the infant must respond to the loss of symbiosis with the mother by creating a symbol of this lack. In doing so the infant is constrained by the always-already present structures of a natural language. There is a certain relief in the summoning of a symbolically present "mother", but the experience of the mother who returns to the infant as someone-signified-by-the-word-"mother" is nevertheless one of absolute, irremediable loss. Mother—and the world—is now mediated by the Symbolic order and the exigencies of language.

With this in mind, the crossing of the two pathways in the graph of desire can be understood to connote interference and constraint. Desire for the primordial object is not fulfilled except through the constraints of the signifying chain. The vector of desire is metaphorical, substituting various objects for the absolutely lost primordial one, and irrupting into language without regard for the passage of time, or for the particular human relationship through which the vector moves.

Finally, the points at which the vector of desire and the signifying chain cross can be seen as instances of Freudian double inscription. The "conscious and unconscious" significance of an act or utterance are one and the same, and each constrains the other.

See also
Demand
Desire

References
Leupin, Alexandre (2004). Lacan Today, Other Press, New York.

External links
A Tour of the Graph of Desire - YouTube guide from LacanOnline.com
The Paradigms of Jouissance – Lacanian Ink 17, Autumn 2000
The Seminars of Jacques Lacan

Psychoanalytic terminology
Jacques Lacan
Post-structuralism
Structuralism